Red fluorescent protein (RFP) is a fluorophore that fluoresces red-orange when excited. Several variants have been developed using directed mutagenesis. The original was isolated from Discosoma, and named DsRed. Others are now available that fluoresce orange, red, and far-red.

RFP is approximately 25.9 kDa. The excitation maximum is 558 nm, and the emission maximum is 583 nm.

The first fluorescent protein to be discovered, green fluorescent protein (GFP), has been adapted to identify and develop fluorescent markers in other colors. Variants such as yellow fluorescent protein (YFP) and cyan fluorescent protein (CFP) were discovered in Anthozoa.

Issues with fluorescent proteins include the length of time between protein synthesis and expression of fluorescence. DsRed has an maturation time of around 24 hours, which can make it unusable for many experiments that take place in a shorter time frame. Additionally, DsRed exists in a tetrameric form, which can affect the function of proteins to which it is attached. Genetic engineering has improved the utility of RFP by increasing the speed of fluorescent development and creating monomeric variants. Improved variants of RFP include mFruits (mCherry, mOrange, mRaspberry), mKO, TagRFP, mKate, mRuby, FusionRed, mScarlet and DsRed-Express.

DsRed has been shown to be more suitable for optical imaging approaches than EGFP.

References

External links 
 DsRed on FPBase
Fluorescent proteins